{{Infobox election
| election_name = 2016 United States Senate election in Oregon
| country = Oregon
| type = presidential
| ongoing = no
| previous_election = 2010 United States Senate election in Oregon
| previous_year = 2010
| next_election = 2022 United States Senate election in Oregon
| next_year = 2022
| election_date = November 8, 2016
| image_size = x150px
| image1 = 
| nominee1 = Ron Wyden
| party1 = Democratic Party (United States)
| popular_vote1 = 1,105,119
| percentage1 = 56.6%| image2 = 
| nominee2 = Mark Callahan
| party2 = Republican Party (United States)
| popular_vote2 = 651,106
| percentage2 = 33.4%
| map_image = 
| map_size = 250px
| map_caption = Wyden:      Callahan:      Tie:   
| title = U.S. Senator
| before_election = Ron Wyden
| before_party = Democratic Party (United States)
| after_election = Ron Wyden
| after_party = Democratic Party (United States)
}}

The 2016 United States Senate election in Oregon''' was held November 8, 2016, to elect a member of the United States Senate to represent the State of Oregon, concurrently with the 2016 U.S. presidential election, as well as other elections to the United States Senate in other states and elections to the United States House of Representatives and various state and local elections.

Incumbent Democratic Senator Ron Wyden was re-elected to a fourth full term in office. It’s the fourth consecutive election of Wyden’s where the counties of Gilliam, Hood River, Jackson, Marion, Polk, Wasco and  Yamhill have supported him, as well as the fifth consecutive election where the counties of Benton, Clackamas, Clatsop, Columbia, Lane, Lincoln, Multnomah, Tillamook and Washington have supported him. Likewise, this is the first senate election since 1998 in which Coos County has not supported him.

Democratic Party primary

Candidates

Declared 
 Kevin Stine, Medford City Councilor
 Paul Weaver, retired locomotive engineer
 Ron Wyden, incumbent U.S. Senator

Declined 
 Peter DeFazio, U.S. Representative

Results

Results by county

Republican Party primary

Candidates

Declared 

 Mark Callahan, information technology consultant and perennial candidate
 Sam Carpenter, businessman and candidate for the U.S. Senate in 2014
 Dan Laschober, business consultant
 Faye Stewart, Lane County Commissioner

Results

Independent Party primary

Candidates

Declared 

 Steven Reynolds, businessman, Progressive nominee for OR-01 in 2012 and Pacific Green nominee for OR-01 in 2014
 Marvin Sandnes, businessman

Results

Working Families Party 
The Working Families Party of Oregon, which usually cross-endorses Democratic candidates, nominated their own candidate in protest of Sen. Ron Wyden's support of the Trans-Pacific Partnership.

Candidates

Declared 
 Shanti Lewallen, attorney, labor union activist, and longshoreman

Pacific Green Party and Oregon Progressive Party 
The Pacific Green Party and the Oregon Progressive Party cross-endorsed Eric Navickas, former member of the Ashland, Oregon City Council.

Candidates

Declared 
 Eric Navickas, former Ashland City Councilman

General election

Predictions

Polling

Results

References

External links 
Official campaign websites
 Mark Callahan for Senate (R)
 Shanti Lewallen for Senate (WFP)
 Eric Navickas for Senate (PGP/OPP)
 Ron Wyden for Senate (D)

Senate
Oregon
2016